Excalibur Airways was a charter airline based in England. It had its head office on the grounds of East Midlands Airport in Castle Donington, Leicestershire.

Code data 
IATA Code: EXC
ICAO Code: EX
Callsign: Originally CAMELOT  then EXCALIBUR

History

Excalibur Airways was formed in the spring of 1992 and was based at the East Midlands Airport.  It began charter operations with three leased Airbus A320s and most of the flights were out of London Gatwick airport. In 1994, one more A320 and a Boeing 737-300 were added.  Excalibur was the first UK charter airline to operate the A320 with its (at the time) new fly-by-wire control system.

Most of the holiday charter flights were to Egypt, although that was not the only destination since they also serviced the holiday resorts in the Mediterranean and North Africa. In 1994 Excalibur offered direct services from Gatwick into Eilat (ETH) in Southern Israel. ETH is conveniently right in the town centre and at the time almost all other operators were flying into Ovda (VDA), which is about an hour by coach to the North of the town. The downside was that, because of weight limitations, return flights had to make a refuelling stop at Tel Aviv (TLV) before continuing on to Gatwick. 

By the summer of 1995, the company had two aircraft operating from London Gatwick airport, one from Manchester, one from East Midlands airport, and one operating north eastern airports, including Newcastle and Humberside.  Flights were still operated to Egypt, as well as to popular Mediterranean destinations such as Spain, Greece, Turkey, Italy, and further afield to the Canary Islands.  Some charter flights also flew to Iceland, and other non-holiday destinations such as Frankfurt.

During 1995 the company operated solely with A320 aircraft.

Then, at the end of 1995, the company wanted to start flights to Florida and the Caribbean, so there was a need for a larger aircraft with more range and the Douglas DC-10-30 was chosen.

Then the airline lost most of its medium-range charter contracts and the service problems that followed forced the travel operators to withdraw their contracts, hence, Excalibur shut down in June 1996. An incident with a DC-10 seen with smoke coming from the aircraft followed by an aborted take-off shattered public confidence in the airline.

Fleet 
7 - Airbus A320-212
1 - Boeing 737-3Q8
1 - Douglas DC-10-30

Aircraft Registrations
A320 - G-BWKO
A320 - G-HAGT
A320 - G-OEXC
A320 - G-BWCP
A320 - G-SCSR
A320 - G-KMAM
A320 - G-BWKN
B737 - G-OCHA
DC10 - V2-LEH

See also 
 List of defunct airlines of the United Kingdom

References

External links

 Fleet and code information

Defunct airlines of the United Kingdom
Companies based in Leicestershire
North West Leicestershire District
Airlines established in 1992
Airlines disestablished in 1996
British companies established in 1992
Transport companies disestablished in 1996
1992 establishments in England
1996 disestablishments in England
British companies disestablished in 1996